The Palace Hotel, located at 216 La Branch in Houston, Texas, was listed on the National Register of Historic Places on September 13, 2006.

See also
 National Register of Historic Places listings in Harris County, Texas

References

1903 establishments in Texas
Commercial buildings completed in 1903
Hotel buildings on the National Register of Historic Places in Texas
National Register of Historic Places in Houston
Romanesque Revival architecture in Texas